Ali Eşref Dede'nin Yemek Risalesi, the second Turkish cookbook was written in 1856 - 57 by Ali Eşref Dede. This book is one of the works written about the dishes of Ottoman period.

See also
Melceü't-Tabbâhîn

References

Ottoman cuisine
Turkish cuisine
Turkish cookbooks